Bush track is a term used in horse racing to describe unsanctioned, informal horse races run in rural areas of the United States and southern Canada.  Quarter horses, ridden by amateur jockeys, are raced on makeshift tracks, often set up in the field where the horses are pastured using barrels or other natural landmarks as the track interior. Race times are never kept and the track length is not uniform.

Some of these tracks are somewhat more formal, with names and a regular following (though seldom more than 1000 would show for a race). Races are often run with only two horses on a track with lanes.  The state of Louisiana is notable for having produced top jockeys who got their start in this setting.

Jockeys who started in the bush tracks:

Robby Albarado
Ronald Ardoin
Calvin Borel
Ray Broussard
Eddie Delahoussaye
Kent Desormeaux
Laverne Fator
Mark Fator
Eric Guerin
Mark Guidry
Craig Perret
Red Pollard
Randy Romero
Shane Sellers
Carroll Shilling
Joseph Talamo
Jack Kaenel

References

Horse racing terminology